Forced labor was used extensively in the Soviet Union as a means of controlling Soviet citizens and foreigners.  Forced labor also provided manpower for government projects and for reconstruction after the war.  It began before the Gulag and Kolkhoz systems were established, although through these institutions, its scope and severity were increased.  The conditions that accompanied forced labor were often harsh and could be deadly.

The following closely related categories of forced labor in the Soviet Union may be distinguished.

Pre-Gulag forced labor of the early Soviet Russia and Soviet Union 
On April 4, 1912, a strike formed by the laborers of the Lena Gold Field Company turned violent when an army detachment open-fired on the crowd. In the reports that followed, a muddled version of events, essentially assuming the army and officials were justified in their actions, left many with questions surrounding the circumstances in which the violence occurred. Labor conditions of the years leading up to the event and the years following could be far from desirable, but in those years laborers maintained the legal right to strike which called for concern about the use of violence against those striking in the Lena Gold Field Company. In the years that followed, under the communist regime, the government began taking rights and enforcing new policies of forced labor that gave less choice to laborers on not only their choice to work but where they would work as well. In July 1918, the Russian Constitution implemented Obligatory Labor Service which was to begin immediately. Then, in 1919, the Russian Labor Code laid out the exemptions such as the elderly and pregnant women and the requirements of obligatory labor to include that workers would be given the choice to work in their trades, if the option was available. If the option was not available, workers would be required to accept the work that was available.  Wages were fixed as of 1917 by the Supreme Counsel of Popular Economy and the work day was to be set to eight hours but a worker and the employer could agree upon overtime to be worked and conditions were laid out for Voluntary work, work that was done on Saturdays and Sundays. Women and children were the exception and specific conditions were laid out for them. At the end of 1919 and in early 1920, there was the introduction of the militarization of labor, supported by both Trotsky and Lenin. In the years to follow under the Stalin regime, laborers would see less and less freedoms in labor and the introduction of GULAG.

The Soviet Gulag system 

Gulags or Glavnoye Upravleniye Lagerej, are described as labor camps which were a police-run system of colonies and special settlements.  The myth surrounding the Gulag was that these forced labor camps would reforge the Soviet citizen who could then become a foundation of the Soviet Society. The real function of the Soviet Gulag was the exploitation of human beings, which occurred by working the people to death or near death before discarding them. Approximately 20% of the prisoners would be freed each year from the Gulags, but these were not rehabilitated criminals, they were usually prisoners who were too weak to perform duties any longer or were suffering from incurable diseases. The types of prisoners ranged from petty criminals to political prisoners.  A 1993 study of the soviet archives revealed that between 14 and 18 million people were imprisoned in the Gulag labor camps from 1929 to 1953.  A further 10 - 11 million people were either deported or were already in the penal system at the time There are no accurate or official archive records prior to 1929.   The Gulag penal system was isolated to the point where there was little or no communication allowed between the different camps, and no mention of the camps were discussed in the wider Soviet society.   This institution was a separate society with its own culture and its own rules.  At the beginning there was rampant brutality and death, but later they began to normalize and operate like any other normal societal town or city.  In most cases the camp commandant would act more like the mayor of the city and would even advocate for better conditions and increased supplies for the people under his control. According to the US Government, conditions were deadly:In 1953, 1954, it was awful conditions in concentration camps. It is hard to explain how bad it was. . . . [S]uch bad food that when I came to the concentration camp, I have seen prisoners which have only bones and skin. Each day in our conentration camp, I do not remember a day when it was less than 20, 25 people--less than 35--which died from starvation.Different categories with the Gulags:  The Gulag system consisted of over 30,000 camps which were broken down into three different categories dependent upon the number of prisoners held at that camp.  A large camp normally held more than 25,000 prisoners each, a medium size camp held from 5,000 to 25,000 and the smallest camps held less than 5,000 prisoners each. These small camps were the most numerous of the labor camps.  Within the penal system there were different types of camps:  prisons, special prisons, special camps, corrective labor colonies, and special purpose camps such as the scientific prison institutes (sharashka), filtration camps and prisoner of war (POW) camps.Deaths within the Gulag system:  Now that the Soviet archives are available for study, it has been determined that there were between 15 and 18 million people held prisoner under Stalin.  There are no reliable records prior to this period.  It is estimated that 1.6 million died within the Gulags, approximately 800,000 killed by the Soviet Secret Police, and another 1 million dying during the exile process after they had been released from the Gulag.

The official Party reason for the Gulags was rehabilitation, but this was not the real purpose.  The prisoners within the Gualgs were forced labor which helped meet the goals of the Five Year Plan, as well as to provide labor for the State run projects such as the Moscow-Volga canal.  There is no doubt the camps were meant to house criminals and misfits who were a danger to society, but what many people were guilty of is saying or doing the wrong thing and then becoming a political prisoner for years.   Stalin viewed these kind of people as enemies of the Party and he wanted them dealt with as enemies.

The institution called Gulag was closed by the MVD order No 020 of January 25, 1960.  Forced labor camps for political and criminal prisoners continued to exist. Political prisoners continued to be kept in one of the most famous camps Perm-36 until 1987 when it was closed.

The Kolkhoz system 

With the rise of the Soviet Union, the old Russian farming system was transformed into something more in line with the Soviet doctrine of collectivization.  One result was what was known as the Kolkhoz, a contraction of the Russian for "collective farm".  Stalin began to push for the collectivization of farms, claiming that economies of scale would help alleviate grain shortages, and seeking to extend Soviet control over peasants wealthy enough to own land and hire labor ("kulaks"). In the late 1920s, Moscow made a push to mandate collectivization, and in 1930, the Central Committee called for the collectivization of  "the huge majority" of peasant farms". By 1932, 61% of peasant households belonged to Kolkhozes, although the transition was far from smooth—peasants actively resisted in a number of ways, including the slaughter of livestock.  While this increased the available grain, as the animals did not need to be fed, it drastically reduced the amount of meat, dairy and leather from the countryside.  As it was easier for officials to seize grain from the collectivized farms, these farms ended up contributing a disproportionate amount of grain on the market in the early 1930s.

At least 6 million kulaks were starved to death by the deliberate policy of the communist state.Joseph Stalin announced the "liquidation of the kulaks as a class" on 27 December 1929. Stalin had said: "Now we have the opportunity to carry out a resolute offensive against the kulaks, break their resistance, eliminate them as a class and replace their production with the production of kolkhozes and sovkhozes." The Politburo of the Central Committee of the Communist Party formalized the decision in a resolution titled "On measures for the elimination of kulak households in districts of comprehensive collectivization" on 30 January 1930. All kulaks were assigned to one of three categories:

 Those to be shot or imprisoned as decided by the local secret political police
 Those to be sent to Siberia, the North, the Urals or Kazakhstan, after confiscation of their property
 Those to be evicted from their houses and used in labor colonies within their own districts

Kolkhozes were typically divided up into "brigades" of 15-30 households.  Over time, these came to be more permanent, and, in the 1950s, they were re-organized into "complex brigades".  Brigades were often themselves divided into "links" of a few people.

As opposed to Sovkhozes, or state-run farms, who employed salaried workers, the Kolkhoz workers were supposed to be paid by the day worked, although the actual rate of pay varied greatly in practice—cash was occasionally used, but more often payment was given in grain, and this only meagerly.  Many peasants relied on their own private plots and livestock, although these were sometimes taken away by Soviet officials.

With the end of the Soviet Union in 1991, the former member states began allowing privatization to various degrees, with some countries disbanding them altogether, and some re-organizing them as different sorts of corporate farms.

Soviet forced labor camps during World War II 
Forced labor was instrumental for the Soviet Union, and during the time of industrialization it was a deemed necessary tool by the Bolsheviks, in order to rid the country of internal enemies, while at the same time using that labor to help achieve a stronger socialist union, and that idea was no different during wartime. Forced labor was a way for the Soviet Union to imprison anyone for any reason, including, but not limited to, Germans, Polish, Asians, Muslim Soviets, as well as Jewish Soviets, or anyone who looked Jewish. The Soviet gulags are seen by many as a system very similar to Nazi concentration camps. During World War II some of these labor camps were turned into camps where prisoners of war were kept, and forced to work under horrible conditions, resulting in a high mortality rate. At the same time there was the creation of another, harsher form of forced labor, the Katorga. Only a small number of people in Gulags were sent to the katorga, and the katorga was used for those who would have been sentenced to death. "After signing the German–Soviet Nonaggression Treaty [a.k.a. "Hitler-Stalin pact"] in 1939 and the Sikorski–Mayski Agreement in 1941:the Soviet Union took part in the invasion of Poland and its subsequent dismemberment. The Soviet authorities declared Poland to be non-existent, and all former Polish citizens from the areas annexed by USSR were treated as if they were Soviet citizens. This resulted in the arrest and imprisonment of approximately 2 million Polish citizens (including a quarter of a million POWs and 1.5 million deportees by the NKVD and other Soviet authorities.

The USSR implemented a series of “labor disciplines” due to the lack of productivity of its Labour force in the early 1930s. 1.8 million workers were sentenced to 6 months in forced labor with a quarter of their original pay, 3.3 million faced sanctions, and 60k were imprisoned for absentees in 1940 alone. The conditions of Soviet workers worsened in WW2 as 1.3 million were punished in 1942, and 1 million each were punished in subsequent 1943 and 1944 with the reduction of 25% of food rations. Further more, 460 thousand were imprisoned throughout these years.

Foreign forced labor 

In July 1937, when it appeared that war was imminent, Stalin ordered the removal of Germans from Soviet soil on the grounds that they were working for the enemy.  An order by the NKVD also stated that German workers were agents of the Gestapo, sent to sabotage Soviet efforts. Of the 68,000 arrests and 42,000 deaths that resulted, only a third were actually German; the remainder were of other nationalities.  Just a month later, the liquidation of Poles was also approved by the Politburo. In 1938, 11,000 people were arrested in Mongolia, most of them lamas. Many other nationalities were swept up in similar operations, including but not exclusive to: Latvians, Estonians, Romanians, Greeks, Afghans, and Iranians. Those that were arrested were either shot or placed in the forced labor system. Americans that had come to the Soviet Union seeking work during the Great Depression found themselves pleading the American embassy for passports so that they could return to their home country. The embassy refused to issue new passports and the emigrants were arrested and sent to prison, Gulag camps, or executed.

The UPV camp system, separate from the Gulag, was established in 1939 to utilize POWs and foreign civilians for labor.  It eventually included several hundred camps and thousands of auxiliary camps which held millions of foreign prisoners during their years of operation. The camps were not uniform in the ways they treated and provided for prisoners but, in general, conditions were harsh and could be deadly.  Work days were usually 10–14 hours long and camps were often marked by unsafe work conditions, insufficient food and clothing, and limited access to medical care.

The Soviet Union did not sign the Geneva Conventions and so were not obligated to adhere to its stipulations concerning prisoners of war.  The Soviet Union retained POWs after other countries had released their prisoners, only beginning to do so after Stalin's death in 1953.  The remainder of prisoners were released in 1956 to build diplomatic relations with West Germany.

References

See also
Katorga, penal labor in the Russian Empire
Pre-Gulag forced labor of the early Soviet Russia and Soviet Union 
The Gulag system, 
The kolkhoz system 
Foreign forced labor in the Soviet Union of 1939-1954 which included forced labor of World War II prisoners of war and internees.
Post-Joseph Stalin penal labor in the Soviet Union: Corrective labor colony (Исправительно-трудовая колония, ИТК), Colony-settlement (Колония-поселение), corrective labor without incarceration (Исправительные работы без лишения свободы).

Labor in the Soviet Union
Unfree labor in the Soviet Union
Unfree labour by country
Slavery by type